The whitebarred prickleback (Poroclinus rothrocki), also known as the whitebarred blenny, is a species of marine ray-finned fish belonging to the family Stichaeidae, the pricklebacks and shannies. It is the only species in the monotypic genus Poroclinus. This fish is found in the eastern Pacific Ocean.

References

Lumpeninae
Fish described in 1890
Taxa named by Tarleton Hoffman Bean
Monotypic fish genera